Mimosa is a genus of about 400 species of herbs and shrubs, in the subfamily Mimosoideae of the legume family Fabaceae.

Mimosa or Mimosas may also refer to:

Other species
Acacia dealbata, sometimes known as mimosa, a species of Acacia
Albizia julibrissin, sometimes known as mimosa in the U.S., a species of tree in the family Fabaceae
 Iolaus mimosae, the mimosa sapphire butterfly
 Neurostrota gunniella, the mimosa stem-mining moth 
 Homadaula anisocentra, also known as the mimosa webworm, a moth
 Pyrisitia nise, the mimosa yellow butterfly

Arts, entertainment and media
 Mimosa (album), by Fun Lovin' Criminals, 1999
 Mimosas (film), a 2016 drama film
 Mimosa (magazine), a science fiction fanzine
 Mimosa (magician) (1960–2023), French humorous magician
 Mimosa, a fish in American television series FishCenter Live
 Mimosa, a pseudonym of the author Mabel Cosgrove Wodehouse Pearse 
 Mimosa: A True Story, a 2005 book by Amy Carmichael
 Mimosa Vermillion, a character in the manga series Black Clover
 "Mimosa", a composition by Herbie Hancock, from the 1963 album Inventions & Dimensions

Businesses and organisations
 Mimosa (record label), a 1920s United Kingdom record label
 Mimosa Public School, Sydney, Australia
 Mimosa, a brand of dairy products by the Portuguese company Lactogal

Food and drink
 Deviled egg, or œuf mimosa
 Mimosa (cocktail), made of champagne and orange juice
 Mimosa salad, a festive Russian salad

Places

Mimosa, Queensland, a locality in the Central Highlands Region, Australia
Mimosa, Tennessee, U.S.
 Mimosa, Erin, Ontario, Canada
 Mimosa mine, Zimbabwe

Ships
 Mimosa (ship), a clipper ship that took the first Welsh settlers to Patagonia in 1865
 USS Mimosa (AN-26), an Aloe-class net laying ship

Other uses
 Mimosa Jallow (born 1994), a Finnish swimmer
 Mimosa (star), the second-brightest object in the southern constellation of Crux
 MIMOSA (Micromeasurements of Satellite Acceleration), a Czech microsatellite launched in 2003
 MIMOSA (Machinery Information Management Open Systems Alliance), part of the OpenO&M initiative

See also

 Mimosa Rocks National Park, a national park in New South Wales, Australia